Anwara Habib ( – 27 May 2018) was a Bangladeshi politician from Tangail belonging to Bangladesh Nationalist Party. She was a member of the Jatiya Sangsad.

Biography
Habib was a member of the central committee of Bangladesh Nationalist Party. She was elected as a member of the Jatiya Sangsad from Reserved Women's Seat-14 in 1991.

Habib died on 27 May 2018 at Ibn Sina Hospital in Dhaka at the age of 90.

References

1920s births
2018 deaths
People from Tangail District
5th Jatiya Sangsad members
Bangladesh Nationalist Party politicians
Women members of the Jatiya Sangsad
20th-century Bangladeshi women politicians